Mesoscia is a genus of moths in the family Megalopygidae.

Species
Mesoscia anguilinea Schaus, 1912
Mesoscia dumilla Dyar, 1913
Mesoscia dyari Schaus, 1912
Mesoscia eriophora (Sepp, 1848)
Mesoscia guttifascia (Walker, 1856)
Mesoscia itatiayae Hopp, 1927
Mesoscia latifera Walker, 1869
Mesoscia lorna Schaus, 1905
Mesoscia pascora Schaus, 1900
Mesoscia procera Hopp, 1930
Mesoscia pusilla (Stoll, 1782)
Mesoscia terminata Schaus, 1905
Mesoscia unifascia (Dognin, 1923)
Mesoscia aspersa Dognin, 1922

References

Megalopygidae
Megalopygidae genera